The Niagara Escarpment Commission, founded in June 1973 by the Niagara Escarpment Planning and Development Act (last revised 2012), is an agency of the Ontario government.  Its mission is to "conserve the UNESCO-designated Niagara Escarpment Biosphere Reserve as a continuous natural environment and scenic, working countryside".  The Niagara Escarpment Commission published the first Niagara Escarpment Plan in 1985.  This plan is reviewed and updated every five years, with the most recent version of the plan published in 2017.

The Niagara Escarpment Commission has essentially the same powers and responsibilities as a municipality, including control over zoning and bylaws.

The Commission staff are split between two geographical offices:

 (MTO Complex) Owen Sound, Ontario - north
 (Guelphview Square) Georgetown, Ontario - south

Commission

 8 Public Members at Large including the Commission Chair
 8 municipal representatives from:
 Bruce County - Escarpment runs on the eastern edge of the county
 Dufferin County - Escarpment runs on the eastern edge of the county
 Grey County - Escarpment runs on the eastern edge of the county
 Simcoe County - Escarpment runs on the western edge of the county
 Halton Region - Escarpment runs on the western edge of the region
 Peel Region - Escarpment runs on the western edge of the region
 Niagara Region - Escarpment runs on the northern edge of the region
 City of Hamilton - Escarpment runs through the city

References

External links
 Niagara Escarpment Commission website

Niagara Escarpment
Ontario government departments and agencies
1973 establishments in Ontario
Government agencies established in 1973